23 skidoo (sometimes 23 skiddoo) is an American slang phrase generally referring to leaving quickly, being forced to leave quickly by someone else, or taking advantage of a propitious opportunity to leave. Popularized during the early 20th century, the exact origin of the phrase is uncertain.

23 skidoo has been described as "perhaps the first truly national fad expression and one of the most popular fad expressions to appear in the U.S", to the extent that "Pennants and arm-bands at shore resorts, parks, and county fairs bore either [23] or the word 'Skiddoo'."

"23 skidoo" combines two earlier expressions, "twenty-three" (1899) and "skidoo" (1901), both of which, independently and separately, referred to leaving, being kicked out, or the end of something. "23 skidoo" quickly became a popular catchphrase after its appearance in early 1906.

Origin
Although there are a number of stories suggesting the possible origin of the phrase, none has been universally accepted.

Flatiron Building

Perhaps the most widely known story of the origin of the expression concerns the area around the triangular-shaped Flatiron Building at Madison Square in New York City. The building is located on 23rd Street at the intersection of Fifth Avenue and Broadway, the latter two of which intersect at an acute angle. Because of the shape of the building, winds swirl around it. During the early 1900s, groups of men reportedly gathered to watch women walking by have their skirts blown up, revealing legs, which were seldom seen publicly at that time. Local constables, when sometimes telling such groups of men to leave the area, were said to be "giving them the 23 Skidoo". An early nickelodeon film, What Happened on Twenty-third Street, which dates from 1901, shows a woman's skirt being lifted by the updraft from a ventilation grate, exposing her knees.

Some consider the Flatiron Building origin claim dubious because the slang expressions "23" and "skidoo" were already in use before 1902, the year in which the Flatiron Building was built.

"23" (or "Twenty-Three")
The earliest-known report of the slang expression "23" (or "twenty-three") as a code word for asking someone to leave is a newspaper reference on March 17, 1899:

At the time, a stage version of A Tale of Two Cities, The Only Way, was playing in London. The production moved to New York City later that year; it opened at the Herald Square Theatre on September 16, 1899. Less than two months later, popular slang author George Ade described having heard a new slang expression, "twenty-three":

In the same interview, Ade described two purported origin stories he had heard: that it was "from the English race tracks, twenty-three being the limit on the number of horses allowed to start in one race" or that it had been a signal used in a plot to free a Mexican embezzler from custody in New Orleans.

Skidoo
Webster's New World Dictionary derives skiddoo (with two d's) as probably from skedaddle, meaning "to leave", with an imperative sense.

The word Skidoo was the name of a Lark-class racing sailboat that competed in races on Long Island Sound during the 1901 racing season. The Skidoo competed every summer through at least 1904.

Skidoo is attested, in its conventional, slang sense, by 1904. Skidoo-wagon (as well as "skidoodle wagon" and "skedaddle wagon") was a short-lived euphemism for automobiles during 1904–1905.

The word skidoo, used by itself as a noun denoting a supposed bringer of bad luck, is attested in the early 1910s, in P. G. Wodehouse's Psmith, Journalist. It appeared in newspapers as early as 1906.

Twenty-three, skidoo!
Both of the slang expressions, 23 and skidoo, were used in George M. Cohan's 1904 musical play Little Johnny Jones. Numerous news items from the period credited either Cohan or Tom Lewis (the actor performing the role that spoke those lines in the play) with creating or popularizing one or both of the expressions. Even before the expression "23, skidoo!" became popular in its own right, 23 (or twenty-three) and skidoo were frequently used in conjunction with, or near, one another in the same sentence or paragraph; 23 often as part of the phrase "23 for you [or yours]." For example, "Skiddoo! Git! Twenty-three for yours!", or "Twenty-three for his! Skidoo."

The earliest known use of the expression, in the familiar "23, skidoo!" form, is an advertisement for Billy B. Van's show The Errand Boy: The phrase quickly became a ubiquitous catchphrase, and Google Books has many examples of commercial advertisements using "23-Skidoo" that begin in 1906. For example, the edition of The Shoe Retailer for August 4, 1906, volume 59, No. 5 (Boston, MA), has a full-page ad for a "23-Skidoo" sale, with blurbs such as "23-Skidoo/Says Low Price to the Shoe/Now It's Up to You".

On the RMS Titanic there was a watertight door on E Deck numbered 23 which was informally called the "skidoo door" according to the testimony of the Chief Baker Charles John Joughin.

Other explanations
Cartoonist "TAD" (Thomas A. Dorgan) was credited in his 1929 obituary in The New York Times as being the "First to say 'Twenty-three, Skidoo.'" 
Baseball player Mike Donlin and comedian Tom Lewis may have created the expression as part of their vaudeville act.
An article in the June 26, 1906 New York American credits the phrase to one Patsey Marlson, then a former jockey hauled into court on a misdemeanor charge. At his hearing, Marlson is asked by the judge how the expression came about. He explains that when he was a jockey, he worked at a track which only had room for 22 horses to start in a line. If a 23rd horse was added, the long shot would be lined up behind the 22 horses on the front line. Apparently, "23 skidoo" implied that if the horse in the back was to have any chance of winning, it would really have to run very fast. Marlson also says in the article that the expression was originally "23, skidoo for you."
A parody of Henry Miller's well-regarded stage presentation of Charles Dickens's novel A Tale of Two Cities may have also been the beginning of the phrase. Miller's 1899 production, entitled The Only Way, was staged at the Herald Square Theatre. The final scene of the play portrays a series of executions at a guillotine. As each person is beheaded, an old woman counts. When Sydney Carton, the protagonist of the story, is beheaded, the old woman calls out "Twenty-three!" The grisly scene was remarkable for its time, but it soon became the subject for parody, and the phrase "Twenty-three, skidoo!" was used by Broadway comedians to parody this moment. This seems likely to be an instance of comedians using an already-popular slang juxtaposed against a well-known dramatic moment for the resulting comic effect, and not an indication of invention, although the theatrical usage may have popularized the expression, or made it more widely known.
It is said that 23 was an old Morse code signal used by telegraph operators to mean "away with you." (The same story accounts for 30 as "end of transmission", a code still used by modern journalists in North America, who place -30- at the end of articles as a sign to editors. However, the Western Union 92 Code, which is the source of 30 and other numbers like 73 and 88 still used in amateur radio, lists 23 as "all stations copy".)
An early 1900s Death Valley town had 23 saloons (many basically tents). A visit to all, going 23 skidoo, meant having a very good time.
Death Valley National Park interpreters have sometimes given as an explanation that the early 1900s mining town of Skidoo, California required that a water line be run from the source of water on Telescope Peak to the town – a distance of 23 miles. Most thought it would be easy, but the immensely hard rock along the course made it very difficult; it was eventually accomplished by a determined engineer. The term "23 Skidoo" was then used as a statement of irony, something like "duck soup": a reference to something apparently easy, but actually very difficult. Other interpreters simply say the 23 mile pipeline and the popular slang phrase is what gave the town its name. 
A jump rope rhyme that ended up "butterfly, butterfly, twenty three to do" dates to 1909 and may be the origin of this phrase.
In The Literature of Slang (p. 38), W.J. Burke claims that the term "skidoo" was coined in 1906 by the musical comedy star Billy B. Van, citing an article in the Indianapolis Morning Star, March 31, 1906.
 In the book The Age of Uncertainty by John Kenneth Galbraith (Houghton Mifflin, 1977), Skidoo 23 refers to the abandonment of a town, Skidoo, in the Panamint Mountains of Death Valley National Park in California in the early 1900s. The number 23 apparently refers to the number of miles water had to be piped to the town and its sole reason for being; the mining of gold. After the mines were depleted, the town ceased to exist.
 In the book The Confessions of a Con Man as Told to Will Irwin by Will Irwin (B. W. Huebsch (New York) 1913), 23 relates to a rigged dice game called a cloth that travelled with small American circuses and carnivals in the latter part of the 19th century. It referred to a square marked 23 You Lose on the cloth which had 48 printed squares but only the one You Lose square. After making a big bet, the sucker was at some point persuaded that he had rolled a 23, had thereby lost his money and should stop squawking and beat it. This became, by a logical extension, an in-crowd, underworld expression indicating that for whatever reason the person addressed would not get what he was seeking and should clear out.

Examples of use

The Love Sonnets of a Car Conductor (1908): 
The House Boat Boys; or Drifting Down to the Sunny South (1912): 
Make Way for Tomorrow (1937): 
A Tree Grows in Brooklyn (1943): 
Cheaper by the Dozen (1948): 
The saying was in popular usage prior to 1912, as it appears in the transcript of the Titanic Inquiry: 
William S. Burroughs wrote a short story in 1967 titled "23 Skidoo".
In an episode of Popeye the Sailor Man (1954), titled "Taxi-Turvy", Olive Oyl asks Popeye to take her to 23 Skidoo Street: "23 Skidoo Street, driver."
Aleister Crowley in The Book of Lies (ca. 1912–13) titled Chapter 23 "Skidoo", with the comment that "23" and "Skidoo" are American words meaning "Get out".
 There is a post-punk band originating in the 1970s named 23 Skidoo.
 The password '23skidoo' was used by Microsoft to encrypt WFWSYS.CFG configuration file using RC4, which was used in early Windows for Workgroups installations.
 Spat what he knew, energy for true. To all fake rappers, twenty-three skidoo - "Sofa King" by Dangerdoom, lyrics by MF Doom

See also
23 enigma

References
Notes

External links
Water pipeline to Skidoo ghost town, 23 miles long

Word Detective column on origin of 23-skidoo
23 Skidoo from the Museum of the City of New York Collections blog

Articles containing video clips
English-language slang
1900s neologisms
Quotations from literature
Catchphrases
English words and phrases